Ina Rama (born 21 November 1972 in Durrës) was the Prosecutor General of the Republic of Albania from 2007 to 2012.

She was appointed in 2007 to replace Theodhori Sollaku, who had been removed from office through a procedure later ruled unconstitutional by the Constitutional Court of Albania. Nevertheless, Rama was not removed from office in order to restore Sollaku.

Rama is an external lecturer at the Aleksandër Moisiu University.

References

Living people
20th-century Albanian lawyers
21st-century Albanian lawyers
Prosecutors general of Albania
1972 births
People from Durrës
University of Tirana alumni